The Kinks are an English rock band from Muswell Hill, London. Formed in January 1963, the group originally included lead vocalist and rhythm guitarist Ray Davies, lead guitarist and second vocalist Dave Davies (Ray's younger brother), bassist and backing vocalist Pete Quaife, and drummer Mick Avory. In April 1969, Quaife left the band after opposing recent stylistic changes, with John Dalton – who had previously substituted for the bassist in 1966 after he broke his foot – taking his place. The following May, the Kinks expanded to a five-piece lineup with the addition of John Gosling as their first full-time keyboardist. This lineup remained stable until 1976, when Dalton left. After a couple of years of frequent lineup changes, the band finally stabilized with the additions of bassist Jim Rodford and keyboardist Ian Gibbons. After two more studio albums, Mick Avory left the Kinks in July 1984 following numerous conflicts with Dave Davies, which had culminated in his exclusion from the recording of "Good Day". He was replaced by Bob Henrit, who completed work on Word of Mouth. Gibbons left in 1989, with Mark Haley taking his place beginning with the tour in support of UK Jive. Haley remained a touring member, with the 1993 album Phobia recorded as a four-piece.

After a European tour, Haley resigned from the Kinks in July 1993, with Gibbons returning to take his place for US dates two weeks later. The group released a final live album, To the Bone, before disbanding after a final tour ending in June 1996 and appearing for the last time together at Dave Davies’ 50th birthday party in February 1997. In 2018, the Davies brothers announced that they were working on new music together with longtime drummer Mick Avory, however since then there has been no studio release and not much indication the band is active.

Members

Current

Former

Session performers

Brass section

Timeline

Lineups

References

External links
The Kinks official website

Kinks, The